Prem Ki Bujhini is a 2016 romantic drama film directed by Sudipto Sarkar and starring Om and Subhashree Ganguly. It is a remake of the 2011 Telugu-language film 100% Love.

Om and Subhasree act together for the first time.

Cast
 Om as Prithwiraj / Raj
 Subhashree Ganguly as Paro / Paromita
 Jannatul Ferdoush Peya as Meera (cameo appearance)

Soundtrack

Remakes

References 

প্রেম কি বুঝিনি মুভি

2010s Bengali-language films
Bengali-language Bangladeshi films
Bengali-language Indian films
Films scored by Savvy Gupta
Bangladeshi remakes of Indian films
Bengali remakes of Telugu films
Bangladeshi remakes of Telugu films
Jaaz Multimedia films